Sim Daniel Abraham (born August 15, 1924) is an American businessman, investor, and philanthropist. He is the founder of Thompson Medical, whose main product is Slim-Fast, a diet program. He has endowed the S. Daniel Abraham Center for Middle East Peace and he supports Jewish causes in Florida and Israel.

As of October 2018, he had a net worth of $2.1 billion.

Early life
Abraham was born on August 15, 1924, the son of Stella K. and Dr. Samuel Abraham. He was raised in an Orthodox Jewish home in Long Beach, New York. His father was a Zionist and follower of Ze'ev Jabotinsky; and Abraham as a teen printed his own newsletter warning Americans about the danger from the Nazis. During World War II, Abraham served in the United States Army in Europe. In 1970, he moved to Israel with his wife and children where he lived through the 1973 Yom Kippur War and returned to the United States in 1978.

Career
Abraham founded Thompson Medical, which introduced the Slim-Fast line of diet products in the late 1970s. Abraham made Thompson Medical private in 1988; Unilever acquired Slim-Fast for $2.3 billion in 2000. As of October 2016, he had an estimated wealth of US$2.1 billion.

Abraham is the author of the book Peace is Possible, with a foreword by President Bill Clinton. Abraham also published his memoirs in 2010, entitled Everything is Possible: Life and Business Lessons from a Self-Made Billionaire and the Founder of Slim Fast.

Philanthropy
Abraham founded the Center for Middle East Peace in Washington, D.C. Through personal friendship with leaders in the United States, Israel, and throughout the Middle East, he has worked   over the past two decades to help bring an end to the Arab/Israeli conflict. He is a major sponsor of the Washington-based United States Institute of Peace.

Abraham endowed an S. Daniel Abraham Chair in Middle East Policy Studies at Princeton University and a Chair in Nutritional Medicine at Harvard University Medical School.  He has endowed the S. Daniel Abraham Center for Middle East Peace and the S. Daniel Abraham Center for International and Regional Studies at Tel Aviv University. He funded the Dan Abraham School for Business Administration and Economics at Bar-Ilan University in Israel, and the S. Daniel Abraham Israel Program at Yeshiva University, and Honors Program at Stern College for Women. He holds honorary doctorates from the Ben-Gurion University of the Negev, Bar-Ilan University and Yeshiva University. He is also the founder of the New Synagogue of Palm Beach. His gift to the Mayo Clinic served to create the Dan Abraham Healthy Living Center, whose opening in 2007 received national media coverage. The Stella K. Abraham High School for Girls was dedicated in honor of his mother.

He is a founding member of the New Synagogue of Palm Beach.

Political contributions
Abraham is a long-time donor to the Democratic Party and the Clinton Foundation. He gave $1.5 million to the party and ranked as the number one contributor of soft money to the national parties in 2000.

Abraham donated $3 million to Priorities USA Action, a super PAC which supported Hillary Clinton's 2016 presidential campaign.
In 2020 he's donated $5 million to Democratic aligned Super PACs, including American Bridge 21st Century, House Majority PAC, and Senate Majority PAC.

Personal life
Abraham is divorced from his first wife, Estanne Weiner; they have four daughters: Rebecca, Simmi, Leah, and Tammy. He resides in Palm Beach, Florida.

Abraham is currently married to Ewa Sebzda, with whom he has two children, Sarah and Sam. He has 27 grandchildren and MANY great-grandchildren

References

1924 births
Living people
American billionaires
American health care businesspeople
American Orthodox Jews
Businesspeople from New York (state)
Jewish American philanthropists
New York (state) Democrats
People from Long Beach, New York
People from Palm Beach, Florida
Philanthropists from New York (state)
Military personnel from New York (state)
United States Army personnel of World War II
21st-century American Jews